Paraspori is a small settlement in Sitia, Lasithi, Crete, Greece.

References 

Populated places in Lasithi